Aonla Assembly  constituency is one of the 403 constituencies of the Uttar Pradesh Legislative Assembly, India. It is a part of the Bareilly district and one of the five assembly constituencies in  the Aonla Lok Sabha constituency. First election in this assembly constituency was held in 1952 after the "DPACO (1951)" (delimitation order) was passed in 1951. After the "Delimitation of Parliamentary and Assembly Constituencies Order" was passed in 2008, the constituency was assigned identification number 126.

Wards / Areas
Extent of Aonla Assembly  constituency is KCs Aonla, Aliganj, Siroli, Aonla NPP & Siroli NP of  Aonla Tehsil.

Members of the Legislative Assembly

Election results

2022

2012
16th Vidhan Sabha: 2012 General  Elections

See also
Aonla Lok Sabha constituency
Bareilly district
Sixteenth Legislative Assembly of Uttar Pradesh
Uttar Pradesh Legislative Assembly
Vidhan Bhawan

References

External links
 

Politics of Bareilly district
Assembly constituencies of Uttar Pradesh
Constituencies established in 1951